Cameron Akash James Gregory (born 20 January 2000) is an English professional footballer who currently plays as a goalkeeper for National League North club Boston United.

Early life
Gregory was born in Sutton Coldfield in the West Midlands.

Career
Gregory had spells at Birmingham City and Wolverhampton Wanderers at youth level. He joined Shrewsbury Town at under-15 level. He was awarded a scholarship the same year.

On 29 August 2017, whilst still a scholar, Gregory was called up to the first-team squad. He was an unused substitute in a 2–3 away win at Coventry City in the EFL Trophy. He also made the bench in games against West Bromwich Albion U23s and Walsall, also both in the EFL Trophy. For the remainder of the 2017–18 season, he regularly trained with Danny Coyne and the rest of the first-team goalkeepers. In April 2018, Gregory, along with Ryan Sears and Christos Shelis, was offered a professional contract. In May 2018, he signed his first professional contract.

In September 2018, Gregory joined National League South side Chippenham Town on a month-long loan deal. However, just days into the loan, he was recalled due to a training injury to first-team keeper Steve Arnold. A month later in October, Gregory was loaned out once again, this time to Southern League Division One Central side Halesowen Town on a month-long loan.

On 31 July 2019, Gregory joined National League North side Kidderminster Harriers on loan until January 2020. However, on 7 November, he was recalled back to Shrewsbury due to an injury to Max O'Leary.

On 6 March 2020, Gregory was loaned out once again, this time to Northern Premier League side Nantwich Town, joining The Dabbers on a month-long loan. Due to the COVID-19 pandemic, the loan was cut short due to the Northern Premier League season being ended early.

On 30 June 2020, he signed a new deal with his parent club which would keep him at the club until 2022, with the option of a further year.

On 9 October 2020, Gregory moved on loan once again, this time joining Hednesford Town on a month-long deal.

On 29 June 2022, Gregory joined National League North club Kettering Town following his release from Shrewsbury Town at the end of the 2021–22 season. In what turned out to be Gregory's last game for Kettering Town away at Bradford (Park Avenue) on January 7 2023 he received a red card in injury time of the first half.

On 12 January 2023, Gregory signed for National League North side Boston United.

Cameron is superstitious over playing wearing the number 1 and prefers to play wearing the number 21.

References

External links
Soccerway

2000 births
Living people
English footballers
Association football goalkeepers
People from Sutton Coldfield
People from Birmingham, West Midlands
Shrewsbury Town F.C. players
Chippenham Town F.C. players
Halesowen Town F.C. players
Kidderminster Harriers F.C. players
Nantwich Town F.C. players
Hednesford Town F.C. players
Kettering Town F.C. players
Boston United F.C. players
National League (English football) players
Northern Premier League players
Southern Football League players